Monte Piambello is a mountain of Lombardy, Italy. It has an elevation of 1,125 metres above sea level.

The summit of the Mount is the highest point of the Cinque Vette Park

Mountains of Lombardy
Mountains of the Alps